Jerry Brown  (born 1938) is an American politician, Governor of California.

Jerry Brown may also refer to:

Jerry Brown (gridiron football) (1987–2012), American football player
Jerry Dolyn Brown (1942–2016), American folk artist and potter
Jerry B. Brown (born 1942), American anthropologist and ethnomycologist

See also
Gerald Brown (disambiguation)
Gerry Brown (disambiguation)
Gerry Browne (disambiguation)
Jeremiah Brown (disambiguation)
Jeremy Brown (disambiguation)
Jerome Brown (1965–1992), American football defensive lineman
Jerome Brown (arena football) (born 1965), American football player
Jerry Browne (born 1966), Major League Baseball second baseman